Federico O. Escaler, S.J.  (June 28, 1922 – November 28, 2015) was a Filipino Prelate of the Roman Catholic Church.

Escaler was born in Manila and was ordained a priest on June 19, 1954, from the religious order of the Society of Jesus. Escaler was appointed titular bishop to the Girus Tarasii as well as prelate to the Diocese of Kidapawan on June 12, 1976, and ordained bishop on July 31, 1976. Escaler would resign as titular bishop of Girus Tarasil on February 18, 1978. On February 23, 1980 Escaler was appointed prelate to the Diocese of Ipil and would remain in the post until his retirement on June 28, 1997. He died on November 28, 2015 in Manila.

References

External links
Catholic-Hierarchy

1922 births
2015 deaths
20th-century Roman Catholic bishops in the Philippines
People from Manila
20th-century Filipino Jesuits
Filipino military personnel of World War II
Jesuit bishops
Deaths from brain cancer in the Philippines